Madalina-Bianca Molie (born ) is a Romanian weightlifter, who competed in the 69 kg category and represented Romania at international competitions. She won the silver medal in the snatch at the 2014 European Weightlifting Championships. Later in 2014 she tested positive on the forbidden substance stanozolol and was banned for two years by the International Weightlifting Federation (IWF).

Major results

References

1996 births
Living people
Romanian female weightlifters
Place of birth missing (living people)
Doping cases in weightlifting
Romanian sportspeople in doping cases
European Weightlifting Championships medalists
21st-century Romanian women